Würzburg is a Landkreis (district) in the northwestern part of Bavaria, Germany.
Neighboring districts are (from the north, clockwise) Main-Spessart, Schweinfurt, Kitzingen, Neustadt (Aisch)-Bad Windsheim, and the district Main-Tauber in Baden-Württemberg. The city Würzburg is not part of the district, although it is completely enclosed by it.

History
In 1852, districts were created in the region, including the two precursor districts of Würzburg and Ochsenfurt. In 1972 the previous district Würzburg was merged with the former district Ochsenfurt, and several municipalities from the districts Marktheidenfeld, Karlstadt, Kitzingen and Gerolzhofen were added to form the district with today's borders.

Economy
In 2017 (latest data available) the GDP per inhabitant was €28,681. This places the district 86th out of 96 districts (rural and urban) in Bavaria (overall average: €46,698).

Partnerships
The district has sister city-like partnerships with these regions:
  - Mateh Yehuda Regional Council, Israel
  - Olomouc Region, Czech Republic

Coat of arms
The district coat of arms might be described thus: Per fess in chief gules dancetty of three argent, in base per pale argent two lions passant guardant sable armed and langued of the first and azure a fleur-de-lis Or.

In chief (the upper part of the coat of arms) is the "Franconian Rake", the symbol of the former Bishopric of Wurzburg. In base, on the dexter (armsbearer’s right, viewer’s left) side, the fleur-de-lis is the symbol of the St. Burkhard Abbey in Würzburg, while the lions on the sinister (armsbearer’s left, viewer’s right) side derive from the coat of arms of the former Ochsenfurt district.

Towns and municipalities

References

External links

 Official website

 
Districts of Bavaria